La Corota Island Flora Sanctuary is the smallest protected area of the Colombian National Natural Park System, covering just under 16 hectares of land and surrounding water area. Located on the Laguna de la Cocha, the flora sanctuary serves as a natural habitat for endemic sub-tropical Andean cloud forest plant species as well as a number of waterfowl, amphibians, and fish. Established as a flora and fauna sanctuary on June 6, 1977, La Corota Island has become one of the most visited national parks in Colombia having recorded 28,000 individual visitors in 2018.

Geography and climate

Located in western Colombia, La Corota Island is the only lake island with old-growth Andean forest in the country. The sanctuary covers the entirety of the island and four hectares of surrounding water area.

Flora and fauna

Flora
Hieronyma macrocarpa
Eugenia stipitata
Befaria glauca
Hesperomeles glabrata
Drymis granantesis

Mammals

Soft-furred Oldfield mouse
Chiroptera

Birds
 Fulica ardesiaca
 Pied-billed grebe
 Black-crowned night heron
 Rufous-collared sparrow
 Red-crested cotinga
 Great thrush
 Glossy-black thrush
 Spectacled whitestart
 Golden-fronted whitestart
 Slaty brushfinch
 Sparkling violetear
 Collared inca

Activities

La Corota Island Flora Sanctuary offers research and recreational opportunities for its visitors. Despite its size, the island accounts for two hiking trails, the 550 meter El Quiche trail and the 200 meter La Totora trail. In addition, La Corota island is renowned as a birdwatching and ecotourism destination.

References

External links

National parks of Colombia
1977 establishments in Colombia